Beitar Jerusalem is an Israeli women's football club from Jerusalem, which play in Israeli women's league and the Israeli Women's Cup. The club is affiliated with Beitar Jerusalem Football Club and played its matches in the club's training ground in Bayit VeGan neighborhood.

History
The club was among the first to be established in Israel, as the IFA set up the women's league. The club played in the league until 2007, except for the 2003–04 season, when, due to financial difficulties the club was briefly disbanded. In 2005–06 the club finished third from bottom in the league, and was placed in the newly formed second division for the following season. The club was finished second in the league and was due to promotion to the top division. However, the club withdrew from the league and disbanded.

In the Israeli Women's Cup, the club's best achievement was in 2000, in which the club played at the quarter-finals stage.

In 2007 the club was dissolved and was reestablished in April 2019, to participate in 2019–20 season of Israeli Women League.

Titles
Runners-up:
Israeli 2nd Division (1)
2006–07

References

External links
 Beitar Jerusalem IFA 

Women's football clubs in Israel
Association football clubs established in 1998
Association football clubs established in 2019
Association football clubs disestablished in 2007
 
Jerusalem